Shari English Woods Villarosa is a United States diplomat and career foreign service officer. She was the United States Ambassador to Mauritius and to the Seychelles from 2012 to 2017.

Education 
Shari graduated from the University of North Carolina at Chapel Hill with a degree in International Studies. She also has a law degree from The College of William and Mary. She speaks Spanish, Portuguese, Thai, and Indonesian.

Career 
On September 22, 2012, the United States Senate confirmed Villarosa to be Ambassador Extraordinary and Plenipotentiary of the United States of America to the Republic of Mauritius, and to serve concurrently and without additional compensation as Ambassador Extraordinary and Plenipotentiary of the United States of America to the Republic of Seychelles.

She served as the chargé d'affaires for the United States Embassy in Rangoon, Burma, from August 2005 to September 2008. At the time, there had not been a U.S. Ambassador to Burma since 1990, so as chargé d'affaires, Villarosa was the chief of mission and the most senior official in the embassy.

She previously served as Director of Philippines, Malaysia, Brunei, Singapore Affairs in the Department of State's East Asia and Pacific Bureau, Economic Counselor of the U.S. Embassy in Jakarta, Indonesia, and Chargé d'Affaires of the U.S. Embassy in Dili, East Timor.

Her other overseas assignments have been in Songkhla, Thailand; Brasilia, Brazil; Quito, Ecuador; and Bogotá, Colombia. Her assignments at the State Department in Washington, D.C., have been as Special Assistant to the Under Secretary for Economic Affairs; Deputy Director of the Office of Burma, Cambodia, Laos, Thailand and Vietnam Affairs; Singapore and Indonesia desk officer; and in the Office of Investment Affairs. In addition, she spent a year at the East-West Center in Honolulu, Hawaii, as Diplomat-in-Residence.

See also

List of ambassadors of the United States

References

 https://www.senate.gov/pagelayout/legislative/one_item_and_teasers/nom_confc.htm

|-

|-

1951 births
Living people
Ambassadors of the United States to East Timor
Ambassadors of the United States to Mauritius
Ambassadors of the United States to Myanmar
Ambassadors of the United States to Seychelles
University of North Carolina at Chapel Hill alumni
William & Mary Law School alumni
United States Foreign Service personnel
American women ambassadors
21st-century American diplomats